Avraham Adolf Stand (1870–1919) was a Jewish politician and leading Zionist activist in Austria-Hungary.

Biography
Adolf Stand was born in Lemberg (today Lviv, Ukraine). He became a Zionist in the 1880s, taking an active role in organizing Zionist societies. He was the  editor of the fortnightly Polish-language paper Przyszłość ("Future") and later  Rocznik Żydowski ("Jewish Yearbook"). He was a fervent follower of Theodor Herzl and traveled throughout  Galicia to speak about Zionism.

Public activism
Stand was president of the Zionist organization in Galicia and stood as a candidate in a parliamentary by-election in 1906. Stand obtained 454 votes, but was defeated by Joseph Gold (who won with 850 votes). The election was marred with irregularities. In the 1907 elections to the Austrian parliament, the first to be held with universal suffrage, Stand won the Brody seat as a candidate of the Jewish National Party. In total Stand obtained 2,585 votes in a run-off against Wollerner. He had obtained the support of the Jewish Social Democratic Party, who argued that Stand, despite being a reactionary, represented the lesser evil of the two run-off candidates.

Tribute
A street in Tel Aviv is named after Stand.

References

1870 births
1919 deaths
Politicians from Lviv
Austro-Hungarian Jews
Jewish Ukrainian politicians
People from the Kingdom of Galicia and Lodomeria
Jews from Galicia (Eastern Europe)
Austrian Zionists
Jewish National Party politicians
Members of the Austrian House of Deputies (1907–1911)
Burials at Trumpeldor Cemetery